La Femme Nikita (literally "The Woman Nikita"; called Nikita in Canada) is a Canadian action-drama television series based on the French film Nikita by Luc Besson. The series was co-produced by Jay Firestone of Fireworks Entertainment and Warner Bros. Domestic Television Distribution. It was adapted for television by Joel Surnow. The series was telecast in the United States on the USA Network cable channel on January 13, 1997, and ran for five seasons until March 4, 2001. The series was also aired in Canada on the over-the-air CTV Television Network. La Femme Nikita was the highest-rated drama on American basic cable during its first two seasons. It was also distributed in some other countries.

Comparison with the film 
In the original Luc Besson film (and in the American remake Point of No Return (also released as The Assassin), also released by Warner Bros.), Nikita is a drug-addicted juvenile delinquent who kills a police officer in cold blood during an attempted robbery of a pharmacy. She is later arrested and sentenced to life imprisonment in Nikita, and to death by lethal injection in Point of No Return, upon which she was secretly drugged by the government, faking her death. Nikita is then "recruited" by a secret government organization and transformed into a highly skilled assassin who cannot be traced.

The television series differs from the film versions in one fundamental aspect: Nikita (Peta Wilson) is innocent. She is not a killer, nor a drug user, just a homeless young woman in the wrong place at the wrong time. Section One—an elite, top-secret counter-terrorism organization—sets Nikita up to be accused of murdering a police officer and sentenced to life in prison where she supposedly commits suicide and is brought into Section One. Because Nikita will be killed (or "cancelled") if she fails to comply, she is forced to carry out the organization's ruthless methods of fighting terrorism, while attempting to keep her moral integrity intact. This personal struggle becomes the primary conflict of the series. A key scene in the two theatrical films involves Nikita's first assignment—to murder a VIP in a crowded restaurant. Although the Nikita of the television series eventually does become, by necessity, a ruthless killer, in the television version of this first mission she avoids killing the VIP (whereas the film versions of the character completes the assignment). However, despite the machinations of others in power around her, Nikita retains her compassion and humanity.

Over time, Nikita's secretive and risky romantic involvement with her trainer, the mysterious Michael Samuelle (Roy Dupuis), will become another source of conflict, and the series' most significant relationship. Just before the conclusion of the series, Nikita also learns the truth of why she was recruited into Section One.

Characters

Main cast

Nikita (Peta Wilson)
Falsely accused of killing a police officer, Nikita is sentenced to life in prison. Soon afterward, she is recruited into Section One when the organization fakes her suicide. As the only truly innocent recruit into Section, her compassion and sympathy constantly conflicts with the often ruthless orders she is given. After spending two years being trained by Michael, Nikita learns to use her beauty as a weapon and becomes an expert in martial arts and ordnance. Initially reluctant to kill (she uses creative measures to avoid having to commit a murder during her first mission), she eventually becomes more efficient at doing so. As field operative level 2, she is used in a wide variety of capacities, from "valentine operative" to assassin, despite her moral qualms, but manages to hold on to her humanity while working for the organization. Eventually, she and Michael become romantically involved, a development that threatens not only their standing in Section One, but their very lives. Their relationship is seen as a threat by Operations and Madeline, and they use a mind-altering method on Nikita to rid her of all emotions. Michael manages to reverse the process, but Nikita's performance takes a more professional tone. In the 5th season, Nikita works directly for Center and evaluates all Section One personnel. Nikita discovers the real reason she was taken into Section One — her father was Mr Jones, the head of Center, the organization that controls Section One. Mr Jones' plan was to make Nikita take over as head of Section One and eventually Center. In the series finale, Mr Jones sacrifices himself to achieve these goals.

Michael Samuelle (Roy Dupuis)
Main cast: Seasons 1–4
Special guest star: Season 5
Blank-faced, often emotionless and coldly efficient, Michael Samuelle is a former radical student activist whose protest group sparked the Paris Riots of 1984. Not long after being sent to prison, he is recruited into Section One. He graduates nine months early directly as a level 3 operative. He becomes one of their most successful and respected operatives. A few years later, however, the apparent death of his wife, Simone—a fellow Section One operative whom he married against the wishes of Operations and Madeline, affects him greatly but not enough to grant cancellation. He completely shuts down emotionally, becoming almost an automaton. It is not until Nikita enters the organization that he begins to open up emotionally once again. Simone is revealed to still be alive early in the first season and sacrifices her life to exact revenge on her abductor for her years of imprisonment and torture. This time Michael has Nikita to fall back on. Complicating their often difficult relationship is Michael's "blood cover" marriage to Elena Vacek, the daughter of a fearsome terrorist that Section One has pursued for decades. His son, Adam, is a product of that union. After ten years in Section One, Michael is a level 5 field operative and team leader and is most likely to succeed Operations. He is very accurate with firearms, almost never missing a shot, even while performing acrobatics.

Operations (Eugene Robert Glazer)
Seasons 1–4  (7 shows in season 5)
Level 9, head of Section One. Accountable only to Oversight. A Vietnam veteran, former Lieutenant Paul L. Wolfe was recruited into Section One against his will just before the fall of Saigon. Shrewd and driven, Operations eventually topples Adrian, the founder and head of Section One, seizing control of the organization. While giving lip service to the aims of Section One —the eradication of terrorists and the protection of the innocent—Operations uses Section One as his own power base, gaining considerable control over dictators in many regions of the globe. This lust for power brings him into direct conflict with George, head of Oversight, who on many levels despises Operations. Eventually, Adrian returns from her forced retirement to mount an unsuccessful coup attempt against Operations. He is also distrustful of Nikita, attempting to kill her on a number of occasions, but is grudgingly forced to accept her success at completing Section One missions. (The same is also true of Operations' relationship to Michael, when he discovers Michael's romantic involvement with Nikita.) Operations and Madeline make for an effective partnership, though it includes a brief romance that sometimes causes complications.

Madeline (Alberta Watson)
Main cast: Seasons 1–4
Special guest star: Season 5
Madeline is the Level 9 executive strategist, second-in-command, chief tactician, and psychologist for Section One. She is Operations' closest ally and confidante. The ultimate personification of Section One's ideals, she is cold and efficient in the execution of her duties, which often involve using torture to extract information from captured terrorist subjects. A master manipulator, she knows the psyche of each Section One operative inside and out, and can push the right buttons to get what she wants from each one each time. This brings her into constant conflict with Nikita, whose independent spirit she grudgingly admires, but overall, views as a threat to her control within the organization. Madeline's "Type One Directive" against Michael's and Nikita's romantic partnership kicked off a chain of events that even Madeline was unable to predict, events that eventually forced her to make choices that had major repercussions on the future of Section One.

However she also knows the limits of the operatives. In one episode Nikita was ordered to cancel an operative and she couldn't do it – she tried and faltered. Madeline then entered the scene, told Nikita that was enough, took the gun from her hand, and told Nikita that she could not do her job. Nikita left to the sound of a gun shot as Madeline carried out the "cancellation".

Seymour Birkoff/Jason Crawford (Matthew Ferguson)
Main cast: Seasons 1–4
Special guest star: Season 5
Level 4, head of Comm. Seymour Birkoff is Section One's resident genius, his computer abilities are legendary, he supervises Section missions in progress. He and Walter are close friends despite their wide difference in age, and Nikita sees him like a younger brother. Many years later, Birkoff learns he was one of two twin boys born to a Section operative. The boys became the subject of a Section One psychological comparison, in which Birkoff was kept within Section One, while his brother Jason was adopted by the Crawford family outside the organization. This was due to a fateful flip of the coin by Walter, and when Birkoff discovers this, it permanently strains their relationship. Birkoff's new obsession with leaving Section One leads to the creation of an artificial intelligence program to take his place, in order to create more downtime. Unfortunately, the AI becomes self-aware, and Birkoff sacrifices himself in order to stop it.  Quinn replaces him as the head of Comm. His brother Jason is later recruited by Section One, upgraded to level 1 and sent to Center.

Walter (Don Francks)
Level 7, head of Munitions. Walter is the oldest operative in Section One. He is responsible for creating new and necessary gadgets, tools, and weapons for use on Section One operatives' various missions. While he was sexually attracted to Nikita upon her arrival at Section One, Walter becomes her loyal friend and confidante, even participating in a cover-up to hide the ongoing romantic status of Nikita and Michael. Walter's nickname for Nikita, "Sugar", and his bandana were details added by the actor himself. Walter's brief marriage to, and loss of, Belinda, an "abeyance operative" (one who is scheduled to be eliminated or "cancelled" by Section One) -- is ample motivation for his willingness to do anything for revenge for what Walter perceives as Operations' cruelty. However, Operations continues to spare Walter's life, likely because of a long-standing relationship that began in Vietnam and may have included a period where Walter was Operations' Section trainer, though this is informed speculation. In the series finale, after Operations' death, Walter reveals to Quinn that he once saved Operations' life. Operations did not thank him, but also did not cancel him, even though he had many reasons to do so over the years. Walter states: "I guess in the end, we both came out about even".

Quinn (Cindy Dolenc)
Main cast: Season 5
Recurring: Season 4
Katherine "Kate" Quinn is Seymour Birkoff's replacement as head of Comm, and is markedly different from her predecessor. Arrogant, sharp-tongued and distrustful of all men, she nevertheless is unflappable in the face of danger and capable of manipulating her superiors when necessary. Forced to work alongside the newly recruited Jason Crawford, she shares a number of humorous exchanges when she becomes the focus of his romantic interests. However, her sights are set on Operations, and she apparently seeks to replace Madeline as the woman at his side in charge of Section One. She is later revealed to be working for Mr. Jones.

Recurring guest stars
Actors who appeared in three episodes or more
Carlo Rota as Mick Schtoppel (seasons 1–4) / "Mr. Jones" (seasons 4–5 ) / Reginald "Martin" Henderson (Season 5), a flashy, worldly informant, later revealed to be "Mr. Jones", the head of "Center", an organization above Oversight that directs all Sections.  Later, Mr. Jones is revealed to be another cover identity.  Henderson is exposed as an actor working for Center as a decoy for the real Mr. Jones.
Lindsay Collins as "Devo" One alias Elizabeth (seasons 1–5)
Josh Holliday as "Devo" Two alias Henry (seasons 3–5) (In seasons 1–2, "Devo" Two was portrayed by various uncredited extras.)
Tara Slone as Gail (seasons 1–2), Section operative and Birkoff's girlfriend.
Anais Granofsky as Carla (seasons 1–2), Nikita's neighbour, later revealed to be an operative for Adrian.
Bruce Payne as Jurgen (season 2), a ruthless, brutal high-ranked operative.
Siân Phillips as Adrian (seasons 2, 4), the "Mother" of Section One, who was deposed in a coup orchestrated by Paul and Madeline and seeks to destroy the Section to prevent it from taking over the world.
David Hemblen as George (seasons 3–4), the head of "Oversight", former lover of Adrian and enemy of Operations.
Lawrence Bayne as Davenport (seasons 3–4), a Section One operative loyal to Operations.
 Kris Lemche as Greg Hillinger (seasons 2–4), Birkoff's rival in Section One, later revealed to be a mole for Oversight.
Stephen Shellen as Marco O'Brien (seasons 1, 5), a former police officer who becomes Michael's replacement.
Samia Shoaib as Elena (seasons 3–4), Michael's wife and daughter of a terrorist.
Evan Caravela as Adam (seasons 3–5), Michael's son with Elena.
Kira Clavell as Jasmine Kwong (seasons 4–5), recruit turned Section operative and confidant of Nikita.
 Edward Woodward as Mr. Jones alias Philip, codename 'Flavius' (season 5), the true head of "Center" and Nikita's father.
Polly Shannon as Michelle (season 5), Mr. Jones's mysterious secretary, and Nikita's sister.
Kassandra Marr as Kyria (season 5), the spy.
Conrad Coates as Haled (season 5), the Collective's second in command.
Aidan Devine as Graff (season 5), the leader of the Collective.

Broadcasting history

Ratings success
La Femme Nikita was the number-one drama on basic cable channel USA Network for its first two seasons. It had been "greenlighted" by the network's founder and "cable network pioneer" Kay Koplovitz and nurtured by former USA Network president Rod Perth, a "key player" in its development. But, after Barry Diller assumed control of the network in April 1998, he replaced Perth with Stephen Chao as network president. Heyn observed, "Although both Diller and Chao praised La Femme Nikita publicly, it soon became obvious that the series was no longer a priority. The non-stop publicity the series enjoyed under Perth began to dry up, and the only attention that La Femme Nikita received was the occasional promo spot, and even the frequency of those began to decline." During Nikita's third season, following Chao's "bizarre request that La Femme Nikita cast wrestlers in key terrorist roles as a way to cross-promote USA's broadcasts of the World Wrestling Federation" despite evidence that the shows did not have compatible demographics, Chao also began retooling USA Network's successful "Sunday Night Heat" bloc of action dramas, which also included Pacific Blue and Silk Stalkings; he canceled Silk Stalkings and replaced it with a slate of new series that included The War Next Door, G vs. E, Manhattan, Arizona and Cover Me, all of which ultimately failed in the ratings and were also canceled. Consequently, La Femme Nikita tumbled in the ratings too, although the series still remained the top-rated drama on USA Network, even during its fourth season, when promotional advertisements for the series all but disappeared. Negotiations to continue Nikita for a fifth season and beyond failed owing to "disagreements between USA Network and Warner Bros. over La Femme Nikita'''s renewal terms[,] [which] spilled out publicly into the pages of [industry trade publications] Variety and The Hollywood Reporter."

"Save LFN"
Following the series' cancellation in 2000, its dedicated viewers mounted an extensive fan campaign to revive it. "Save LFN" was not the first successful fan campaign to use the internet to rally fans and renew a canceled series. "These kinds of efforts had resurrected canceled series before, beginning with the original Star Trek on NBC in 1968 all the way up to UPN's Roswell in 2000". However, "Save LFN" is notable for its size and inventiveness, including an "online renewal petition" which led to a full-page advertisement placed in The Hollywood Reporter that requested USA Network and Warner Bros. reconsider their decision. The campaign also amassed over 25,000 letters sent to both companies containing everything from dollar bills featuring images of co-star Roy Dupuis to sunglasses (Nikita's signature accessory) to old TVs, VCRs, and remote controls."Careers That Won't Quit: 'La Femme' Again", CNN.com, January 1, 2001 (December 29, 2000), accessed June 23, 2007. A group of organizers calling themselves "First Team", based on the term for the lead members of a mission used frequently in the series, coordinated most of these efforts through their Save LFN fansite. As a result of these efforts, Stephen Chao announced in September 2000 that La Femme Nikita would return for a truncated fifth season of eight new episodes, which began airing in January 2001.

"Naming Convention"
In La Femme all the episodes had the same number of words in their titles as the series number. All episodes in series 1 had one word titles, in series 2 two word titles and so on. 

CW series

On January 28, 2010, it was reported that The CW Television Network would develop a new TV pilot based loosely on the French film Nikita. The new show, which shares its name with the film, is executive-produced by McG, with Peter Johnson and Craig Silverstein serving as executive producers and writers.  It is a joint production with Warner Bros. Studios and Wonderland Productions. On May 18, 2010, it was picked up to series.

 Merchandising 

Home media
The complete series is available on DVD through Warner Bros. Home Video. The box sets use the USA/international title, La Femme Nikita.

Each DVD boxed set features a solitary image of Peta Wilson on the cover, with the remainder of the cast featured on the interior artwork. Only the covers for seasons one and five feature images of Wilson taken specifically as promotional photographs (for advertising campaigns and later marketing purposes) during those seasons. The DVD cover images for seasons two and three again feature promotional photographs used during the first season, while season four features a promotional photograph from advertisements for the second season.

 Season Two was originally scheduled for release on July 20, 2004, but it was delayed for two years due to a confusion in music licensing. Warner Bros. was unable to license the song "Loaded Gun" by Hednoize, featured in the episode "Off Profile." (Some websites have claimed that the song in question was from Garbage, but that is incorrect.) This was eventually resolved by replacing the song with another piece of music. A small number of Season Two box sets were distributed and sold in 2004 with "Loaded Gun" before it was withdrawn from store shelves and internet sales sites, and these sets are considered collectors' items.

Soundtracks

An official soundtrack, released in June 1998, is still available on CD from TVT Records. It features the title theme from composer Mark Snow, as well as numerous songs heard during the first two seasons of the show from artists like Depeche Mode and Afro Celt Sound System.  A "promotional release" in a limited run of 2000 CDs of Emmy-award winning composer Sean Callery's selections from his orchestral score for Nikita was first made available by Callery during the Close Quarters Standby 4 fan convention in May 2001.

Series merchandise
According to Christopher Heyn, "To many long-time viewers, La Femme Nikita had always been a natural for merchandising. Besides the usual array of T-shirts, jackets, coffee mugs, posters and other trinkets, the action content of the series lends itself perfectly to the development of video games, comic books, toys and action figures. Yet, during the entire run of the series, Warner Bros. released only one piece of merchandise—the soundtrack CD on TVT Records.  Beyond that, there was nothing. This frustrated [former president of USA Network and key player in the series' development] Rod Perth to no end."(20) Heyn quotes Perth as saying: Warner Bros. never had an interest in this show ... (20). Nevertheless, Heyn reports, he himself "successfully brokered an official merchandising agreement between the Specialty Products division, a vendor in Toronto that already produced merchandise for the series' cast and crew, and the Sidekicks Society, the organizers of Close Quarters Standby 2", the second in a series of four La Femme Nikita fan conventions held in Toronto in October 1999.(Heyn 20) Such items included jackets, T-shirts, coffee mugs, and key chains emblazoned with the series logo and the copyright notice "©1999, Warner Bros." below the logo (photograph in Heyn 21). "Because of a delivery mixup," Heyn's photo caption reads, "most of the coffee mugs and keychains never made it to the convention in time for sale," and he adds, "The remaining boxes of jackets, T-shirts and coffee mugs sold out in less than an hour, leaving many empty-handed attendees frustrated and upset."(21) Moreover, Heyn observes, "That unfortunate outcome only validated Warner Bros.' reticence to merchandise La Femme Nikita on a larger scale. The studio lost money on the internet broadcast and made next to nothing from the limited merchandising deal, which echoed their attitude toward the series' financial construction."(Heyn 20)

In 2001, a video game based on Nikita—featuring dialogue written by La Femme Nikita supervising producer Peter Lenkov—was announced for the Xbox system, but the project was later cancelled.

Critical response
On Metacritic, the first season received a score of 68/100 based on 7 reviews, indicating "generally favorable reviews". Andrea Higbie, writing for The New York Times said, "The show, which has received good reviews in publications including New York magazine, USA Today and The New York Times, is like a long MTV video, with few words but lots of music and action." Tom Gliatto, writing for People, gave the first season a B+, and commented, "Peta Wilson, an Australian actress with the harsh blonde hair, snub nose and oversize, depthless blue eyes of your average mass-produced doll, makes a sexy, amusing Nikita." Todd Everett, writing for Variety, said, "What was stylish in original version here becomes muddy and confusing attempt at MTV cutting and loud electronic soundtrack, and title may leave many USA watchers, accustomed to more conventional (and arguably superior) Renegade, Silk Stalkings and The Big Easy, confused. [...] Locations are nondescript, with darkish production design and lighting suggestive of some unnamed European country."

The second season received a 7/10 score from Sergio Non, who wrote for IGN: "It's dark, esoteric and morbid, offering up one dose of suffering after another. I couldn't stop watching."

Awards and nominations
CableACE Awards

Gemini Awards

OFTA Television Awards

 See also 
 
 

Notes

References
 Heyn, Christopher.  Inside Section One: Creating and Producing TV's'' La Femme Nikita.  Intro. Peta Wilson.  Los Angeles: POV Press, 2006. .

External links

 

1990s American drama television series
1990s Canadian drama television series
1997 American television series debuts
1997 Canadian television series debuts
2000s American drama television series
2000s Canadian drama television series
2001 American television series endings
2001 Canadian television series endings
CTV Television Network original programming
English-language television shows
Espionage television series
Live action television shows based on films
La Femme Nikita
La Femme Nikita
Television shows filmed in Toronto
USA Network original programming